Schizothorax chongi is a species of ray-finned fish in the genus Schizothorax from the upper parts of the Yangtze basin in China.

References 

Schizothorax
Fish described in 1936